New Brooms is a 1925 American silent romantic comedy film, directed by William C. deMille, and starring  Bessie Love, Neil Hamilton, and Phyllis Haver. It was produced by Famous Players-Lasky and distributed by Paramount Pictures. It is based on Frank Craven's 1924 Broadway play of the same name.

The film is presumed lost.

Plot 

The wealthy Bates family owns a profitable broom factory, but father Thomas Sr. (McWade) is criticized by son Thomas Jr. (Hamilton) for his outdated methods of running the family business. Thomas Sr. agrees to let his son run the business for a year.

The family also takes in Geraldine Marsh (Love), the daughter of a family friend, who has fallen on hard times. Thomas Jr. falls for Geraldine, and breaks off his engagement to Florence Levering (Haver), but then suspects that his father is also in love with Geraldine, and sends his father and Geraldine away.

After his year of managing the company has ended, he has been proven to be an unsuccessful businessman. His father and Geraldine are allowed to return, and when he sees that they were never in love, he marries Geraldine, and returns control of the factory to his father.

Cast

Release and reception 

Because of the name of the film, theaters reported having some difficulty getting audiences into theaters without incorporating broom-themed displays. Such displays did seem to prove successful.

The film did, however, receive positive reviews.

References

External links 

 
 
 
 
 Poster

1925 lost films
1925 romantic comedy films
1925 films
American black-and-white films
American films based on plays
American romantic comedy films
American silent feature films
Films directed by William C. deMille
Lost American films
Lost romantic comedy films
1920s American films
Silent romantic comedy films
Silent American comedy films
1920s English-language films